Jesse Louis Jackson (né Burns; born October 8, 1941) is an American political activist, Baptist minister, and politician. He was a candidate for the Democratic presidential nomination in 1984 and 1988 and served as a shadow U.S. senator for the District of Columbia from 1991 to 1997.

He is the founder of the organizations that merged to form Rainbow/PUSH. Former U.S. Representative Jesse Jackson Jr. is his eldest son. Jackson hosted Both Sides with Jesse Jackson on CNN from 1992 to 2000.

Early life and education
Jackson was born in Greenville, South Carolina, to Helen Burns (1924–2015), a 16-year-old high school student, and her 33-year-old married neighbor, Noah Louis Robinson (1908–1997). His ancestry includes Cherokee, enslaved African-Americans, Irish planters, and a Confederate sheriff. Robinson was a former professional boxer who was an employee of a textile brokerage and a well-known figure in the black community. One year after Jesse's birth, his mother married Charles Henry Jackson, a post office maintenance worker who later adopted the boy. Jesse was given his stepfather's name in the adoption, but as he grew up he also maintained a close relationship with Robinson. He considered both men to be his fathers.

As a child, Jackson was taunted by other children about his out-of-wedlock birth and has said these experiences helped motivate him to succeed. Living under Jim Crow segregation laws, Jackson was taught to go to the back of the bus and use separate water fountains—practices he accepted until the Montgomery bus boycott of 1955. He attended the racially segregated Sterling High School in Greenville, where he was elected student class president, finished tenth in his class, and earned letters in baseball, football, and basketball.

Upon graduating from high school in 1959, he rejected a contract from a minor league professional baseball team so that he could attend the University of Illinois on a football scholarship. After his second semester at the predominantly white school, Jackson transferred to North Carolina A&T, a historically black university in Greensboro, North Carolina. Accounts of the reasons for the transfer differ, though Jackson has said that he changed schools because racial prejudice prevented him from playing quarterback and limited his participation on a competitive public-speaking team.

Writing an article on ESPN.com in 2002, sociologist Harry Edwards noted that the University of Illinois had previously had a black quarterback, but also noted that black athletes attending traditionally white colleges during the 1950s and 1960s encountered a "combination of culture shock and discrimination". Edwards also suggested that Jackson had left the University of Illinois in 1960 because he had been placed on academic probation, but the school's president reported in 1987 that Jackson's 1960 freshman year transcript was clean and said he would have been eligible to re-enroll at any time.

At A&T, Jackson played quarterback and was elected student body president. He became active in local civil rights protests against segregated libraries, theaters, and restaurants. He graduated with a B.S. in sociology in 1964, then attended the Chicago Theological Seminary on a scholarship. He dropped out in 1966, three classes short of earning his master's degree, to focus full-time on the civil rights movement. He was ordained a minister in 1968 and was awarded a Master of Divinity Degree in 2000 based on his previous credits earned plus his life experience and subsequent work.

Civil rights activism

The Greenville Eight

On July 16, 1960, while home from college, Jackson joined seven other African Americans in a sit-in at the Greenville Public Library in Greenville, South Carolina, which only allowed white people. The group was arrested for "disorderly conduct". Jackson's pastor paid their bond, the Greenville News said. DeeDee Wright, another member of the group, later said they wanted to be arrested "so it could be a test case." The Greenville City Council closed both the main library and the branch black people used. The possibility of a lawsuit led to the reopening of both libraries September 19, also the day after the News printed a letter written by Wright.

SCLC and Operation Breadbasket
Jackson has been known for commanding public attention since he first started working for Martin Luther King Jr. In 1965 he participated in the Selma to Montgomery marches organized by James Bevel, King and other civil rights leaders in Alabama. Impressed by Jackson's drive and organizational abilities, King soon began giving Jackson a role in the Southern Christian Leadership Conference (SCLC), though he was concerned about Jackson's apparent ambition and attention-seeking. When Jackson returned from Selma, he was charged with establishing a frontline office for the SCLC in Chicago.

In 1966 King and Bevel selected Jackson to head the Chicago branch of the SCLC's economic arm, Operation Breadbasket and he was promoted to national director in 1967. Operation Breadbasket had been started by the Atlanta leadership of the SCLC as a job placement agency for blacks. Under Jackson's leadership, a key goal was to encourage massive boycotts by black consumers as a means to pressure white-owned businesses to hire blacks and to purchase goods and services from black-owned firms.

T. R. M. Howard, a 1950s proponent of the consumer boycott tactic, soon became a major supporter of Jackson's efforts – donating and raising funds, and introducing Jackson to prominent members of the black business community in Chicago. Under Jackson's direction, Operation Breadbasket held popular weekly workshops on Chicago's South Side featuring white and black political and economic leaders, and religious services complete with a jazz band and choir.

Jackson became involved in SCLC leadership disputes following King's assassination on April 4, 1968. When King was shot, Jackson was in the parking lot one floor below. Jackson told reporters he was the last person to speak to King, and that King died in his arms – an account that several King aides disputed. In the wake of King's death, Jackson worked on SCLC's Poor People's Crusade in Washington, D.C., and was credited with managing its 15-acre tent city – but he began to increasingly clash with Ralph Abernathy, King's successor as chairman of the SCLC. In 1969 The New York Times reported that several black leaders viewed Jackson as King's successor and that Jackson was one of the few black activists who was preaching racial reconciliation.

Jackson was also reportedly seeking coalition with whites in order to approach what were considered racial problems as economic and class problems. "When we change the race problem into a class fight between the haves and the have-nots, then we are going to have a new ball game", he said. In the 21st century, some public school systems are working on an approach for affirmative action that deals with family income rather than race, recognizing that some minority members have been very successful. The Times also indicated that Jackson was being criticized as too involved with middle-class blacks, and for having an unattainable goal of racial unity.

In the spring of 1971 Abernathy ordered Jackson to move the national office of Operation Breadbasket from Chicago to Atlanta and sought to place another person in charge of local Chicago activities, but Jackson refused to move. He organized the October 1971 Black Expo in Chicago, a trade and business fair to promote black capitalism and grass roots political power. The five-day event was attended by black businessmen from 40 states, as well as politicians such as Cleveland Mayor Carl Stokes, and Chicago Mayor Richard J. Daley. Daley's presence was seen as a testament to the growing political and economic power of blacks.

In December 1971 Jackson and Abernathy had a complete falling out, with the split described as part of a leadership struggle between Jackson, who had a national profile, and Abernathy, whose prominence from the Civil Rights Movement was beginning to wane. The break began when Abernathy questioned the handling of receipts from the Black Expo, and then suspended Jackson as leader of Operation Breadbasket for not obtaining permission to form non-profit corporations. Al Sharpton, then youth group leader of the SCLC, left the organization to protest Jackson's treatment and formed the National Youth Movement. Jackson, his entire Breadbasket staff, and 30 of the 35 board members resigned from the SCLC and began planning a new organization. Time magazine quoted Jackson as saying at that time that the traditional civil rights movement had lost its "offensive thrust."

Operation PUSH and the Rainbow Coalition

People United to Save Humanity (Operation PUSH) officially began operations on December 25, 1971; Jackson later changed the name to People United to Serve Humanity. T. R. M. Howard was installed as a member of the board of directors and chair of the finance committee. At its inception, Jackson planned to orient Operation PUSH toward politics and to pressure politicians to work to improve economic opportunities for blacks and poor people of all races. SCLC officials reportedly felt the new organization would help black businesses more than it would help the poor.

In 1978 Jackson called for a closer relationship between blacks and the Republican Party, telling the Party's National Committee that "Black people need the Republican Party to compete for us so we can have real alternatives ... The Republican Party needs black people if it is ever to compete for national office."

In 1983 Jackson and Operation PUSH led a boycott against beer giant Anheuser-Busch, criticizing the company's level of minority employment in their distribution network. August Busch IV, Anheuser-Busch's CEO was introduced in 1996 to Yusef Jackson, Jesse's son, by Jackson family friend Ron Burkle. In 1998 Yusef and his brother Jonathan were chosen by Anheuser-Busch to head River North Sales, a Chicago beer distribution company, leading to controversy. "There is no causal connection between the boycott in 1983 and me meeting in the middle '90s and me buying this company in 1998," said Yusef.

In 1984 Jackson organized the Rainbow Coalition and resigned his post as president of Operation PUSH in 1984 to run for president of the United States, though he remained involved as chairman of the board. PUSH's activities were described in 1987 as conducting boycotts of business to induce them to provide more jobs and business to blacks and as running programs for housing, social services and voter registration. The organization was funded by contributions from businesses and individuals. In early 1987 the continued existence of Operation PUSH was imperiled by debt, a fact that Jackson's political opponents used during his race for the 1988 Democratic Party nomination. In 1996 the Operation PUSH and Rainbow Coalition organizations were merged.

International activism
Jackson's influence extended to international matters in the 1980s and 1990s. In 1983, he traveled to Syria to secure the release of a captured American pilot, Navy Lt. Robert Goodman, who was being held by the Syrian government. Goodman had been shot down over Lebanon while on a mission to bomb Syrian positions in that country. After Jackson made a dramatic personal appeal to Syrian President Hafez al-Assad, Goodman was released. The Reagan administration was initially skeptical about Jackson's trip, but after Jackson secured Goodman's release, Reagan welcomed Jackson and Goodman to the White House on January 4, 1984. This helped to boost Jackson's popularity as an American patriot and served as a springboard for his 1984 presidential run. In June 1984 Jackson negotiated the release of 22 Americans being held in Cuba after an invitation by Cuban president Fidel Castro.

On the eve of the 1991 Persian Gulf War, Jackson made a trip to Iraq to plead with Saddam Hussein for the release of foreign nationals held there as a "human shield", securing the release of several British and 20 American individuals.

In 1997, Jackson traveled to Kenya to meet with Kenyan President Daniel arap Moi as United States President Bill Clinton's special envoy for democracy to promote free and fair elections. In April 1999, during the Kosovo War, he traveled to Belgrade to negotiate the release of three U.S. POWs captured on the Macedonian border while patrolling with a UN peacekeeping unit. He met with then-Yugoslav president Slobodan Milošević, who later agreed to release the three men.

His international efforts continued into the 2000s. On February 15, 2003, Jackson spoke in front of over an estimated one million people in Hyde Park, London at the culmination of the anti-war demonstration against the imminent invasion of Iraq by the U.S. and the United Kingdom. In November 2004 Jackson visited senior politicians and community activists in Northern Ireland in an effort to encourage better cross-community relations and rebuild the peace process and restore the governmental institutions of the Belfast Agreement.

In August 2005 Jackson traveled to Venezuela to meet Venezuelan President Hugo Chávez, following controversial remarks by televangelist Pat Robertson that implied that Chávez should be assassinated. Jackson condemned Robertson's remarks as immoral. After meeting with Chávez and addressing the Venezuelan Parliament, Jackson said there was no evidence that Venezuela posed a threat to the U.S. He also met representatives from the Venezuelan African and indigenous communities.

In 2005 Jackson was enlisted as part of the United Kingdom's Operation Black Vote, a campaign Simon Woolley ran to encourage more of Britain's ethnic minorities to vote in political elections ahead of the 2005 General Election.

In 2009 Jackson served as a speaker for the International Peace Foundation on the topic "Building a culture of peace and development in a globalized world". He visited multiple locations in Malaysia, including the Institute of Diplomacy and Foreign Relations of the Ministry of Foreign Affairs, and in Thailand, including NIST International School in Bangkok.

Political activism
During the 1980s Jackson achieved wide fame as a politician and a spokesman for civil rights issues.

1984 presidential campaign

On November 3, 1983, Jackson announced his campaign for President of the United States in the 1984 election, becoming the second African American (after Shirley Chisholm) to mount a nationwide campaign for president as a Democrat.

In the Democratic primaries, Jackson, who had been written off by pundits as a fringe candidate with little chance at winning the nomination, surprised many when he took third place behind Senator Gary Hart and former Vice President Walter Mondale, who eventually won the nomination. Jackson garnered 3,282,431 primary votes, or 18.2% of the total, in 1984, and won primaries and caucuses in Louisiana, the District of Columbia, South Carolina, and Mississippi. More Virginia caucus-goers supported Jackson than any other candidate, but Mondale won more Virginia delegates.

In May 1988 Jackson complained that he had won 21% of the popular vote but was awarded only 9% of the delegates. He afterwards stated that he had been handicapped by party rules. While Mondale (in the words of his aides) was determined to establish a precedent with his vice presidential candidate by picking a woman or visible minority, Jackson criticized the screening process as a "p.r. parade of personalities". He also mocked Mondale, saying that Hubert Humphrey was the "last significant politician out of the St. Paul–Minneapolis" area.

Relations with Jewish community
Jackson was criticized in the early 1980s for referring to Jews as "Hymies" and New York City as "Hymietown" in remarks to a black Washington Post reporter. ("Hymie" is a pejorative term for Jews.) He had mistakenly assumed the references would not be printed. Louis Farrakhan made the situation worse by issuing, in Jackson's presence, a public warning to Jews that "If you harm this brother [Jackson], it will be the last one you harm." During a speech before national Jewish leaders in a Manchester, New Hampshire synagogue, Jackson publicly apologized to Jews for the pejorative remarks, but did not denounce Farrakhan's warning. A rift between Jackson and many in the Jewish community endured at least through the 1990s.

Shortly after President Jimmy Carter fired U.N. Ambassador Andrew Young for meeting with Palestine Liberation Organization representatives, Jackson and other black leaders began publicly endorsing a Palestinian state, with Jackson calling Israel's prime minister a "terrorist" and soliciting Arab-American financial support. Jackson has since apologized for some of these remarks, but they badly damaged his presidential campaign, as "Jackson was seen by many conservatives in the United States as hostile to Israel and far too close to Arab governments."

According to a 1987 New York Times article, Jackson began attempting to improve his relationship with the Jewish community after 1984. In 2000, he was invited to speak in support of Jewish Senator and Vice Presidential candidate Joe Lieberman at the Democratic National Convention.

On March 8, 2020, Jackson endorsed Jewish candidate Bernie Sanders for president.

1988 presidential campaign

In 1988 Jackson again sought the Democratic presidential nomination. According to a November 1987 New York Times article, "Most political analysts give him little chance of being nominated – partly because he is black, partly because of his unretrenched liberalism." But his past successes made him a more credible candidate, and he was both better financed and better organized than in 1984. Jackson once again exceeded expectations as he more than doubled his previous results, prompting R.W. Apple of The New York Times to call 1988 "the Year of Jackson".

In early 1988 Jackson organized a rally at the former American Motors assembly plant in Kenosha, Wisconsin, approximately two weeks after new owner Chrysler announced it would close the plant by the end of the year. In his speech he spoke out against Chrysler's decision: "We have to put the focus on Kenosha, Wisconsin, as the place, here and now, where we draw the line to end economic violence!" He compared the workers' fight to that of the 1965 Voting Rights Movement in Selma, Alabama. As a result, the UAW Local 72 union voted to endorse Jackson, even against UAW rules.

After winning 55% of the vote in the Michigan Democratic caucus, Jackson was considered the front-runner for the nomination, as he surpassed all the other candidates in total number of pledged delegates. But Jackson's campaign suffered a significant setback less than two weeks after the UAW endorsement when he narrowly lost the Colorado primary to Michael Dukakis and was defeated handily the following day by Dukakis in the Wisconsin primary. Jackson's showing among white voters in Wisconsin was significantly better than in 1984, but was also noticeably lower than pre-primary polling had predicted. The back-to-back victories established Dukakis as the front-runner. He went on to win the party's nomination, but lost the general election in November.

Jackson's campaign was also interrupted by allegations regarding his half-brother Noah Robinson Jr.'s criminal activity. Jackson had to answer frequent questions about Noah who was often called "the Billy Carter of the Jackson campaign".

At the conclusion of the Democratic primary season, Jackson had captured 6.9 million votes and won 11 contests: Seven primaries (Alabama, the District of Columbia, Georgia, Louisiana, Mississippi, Puerto Rico, and Virginia) and four caucuses (Delaware, Michigan, South Carolina, and Vermont). Jackson also scored March victories in Alaska's caucuses and Texas's local conventions, despite losing the Texas primary.

Campaign platform
In both races Jackson ran on what many considered to be a very liberal platform. In 1987 The New York Times described him as "a classic liberal in the tradition of the New Deal and the Great Society". Declaring that he wanted to create a "Rainbow Coalition" of various minority groups, including African Americans, Hispanic Americans, Arab-Americans, Asian Americans, Native Americans, family farmers, the poor and working class, and homosexuals, as well as European-American progressives who fit into none of those categories, Jackson ran on a platform that included:
 Creating a Works Progress Administration-style program to rebuild America's infrastructure and provide jobs to all Americans,
 Re-prioritizing the War on Drugs to focus less on mandatory minimum sentences for drug users (which he views as racially biased) and more on harsher punishments for money-laundering bankers and others who are part of the "supply" end of "supply and demand"
 Reversing Reaganomics-inspired tax cuts for the richest ten percent of Americans and using the money to finance social welfare programs
 Cutting the budget of the Department of Defense by as much as fifteen percent over the course of his administration
 Declaring Apartheid-era South Africa to be a rogue nation
 Instituting an immediate nuclear freeze and beginning disarmament negotiations with the Soviet Union
 Supporting family farmers by reviving many of Roosevelt's New Deal–era farm programs
 Creating a single-payer system of universal health care
 Ratifying the Equal Rights Amendment
 Increasing federal funding for lower-level public education and providing free community college to all
 Applying stricter enforcement of the Voting Rights Act and
 Supporting the formation of a Palestinian state.

With the exception of a resolution to implement sanctions against South Africa for its apartheid policies, none of these positions made it into the party's platform in either 1984 or 1988.

Stance on abortion
Although Jackson was one of the most liberal members of the Democratic Party, his position on abortion was originally more in line with pro-life views. Less than a month after the 1973 Supreme Court decision Roe v. Wade legalized abortion, Jackson began a PUSH campaign against the decision, calling abortion murder and declaring that Jesus and Moses might not have been born if abortion had been available in ancient times. Jackson's strong rhetoric on abortion temporarily alienated one of his major supporters, T. R. M. Howard, a Black physician who performed the procedure.

In 1975, Jackson endorsed a plan for a constitutional amendment banning abortion. He also endorsed the Hyde Amendment, which bars the funding of abortions through the federal Medicaid program. In a 1977 National Right to Life Committee News report, Jackson argued that the basis for Roe v. Wade – the right to privacy – had also been used to justify slavery and the treatment of slaves on the plantations. Jackson decried what he believed was the casual taking of life and the decline in society's values. Jackson later changed his views, saying that women have the right to an abortion and that the government should not interfere.

Later political activities

1990s

Jackson ran for office as "shadow senator" for the District of Columbia when the position was created in 1991 serving as such through 1997, when he did not run for reelection. This unpaid position was primarily a post to lobby for statehood for the District of Columbia.

In the mid-1990s Jackson was approached about being the United States Ambassador to South Africa but declined the opportunity in favor of helping his son Jesse Jackson Jr. run for the United States House of Representatives.

Jackson was initially critical of Bill Clinton's moderate, "Third Way" policies. According to journalist Peter Beinart, Clinton was "petrified about a primary challenge from" Jackson in the 1996 election. But Jackson became a key ally in gaining African American support for Clinton and eventually became a close adviser and friend of the Clinton family. His son Jesse Jackson Jr. was elected to the United States House of Representatives from Illinois.

On May 2, 1999, during the Kosovo war, three US soldiers who had been held captive were released as a result of talks with Jackson. Jackson's negotiation was not sanctioned by the Clinton administration.

On November 18, 1999, seven Decatur, Illinois high school students were expelled for two years after participating in a brawl at a football game. The incident was caught on home video and became a national media event when CNN ran pictures of the fight. After the students were expelled, Jackson argued that the expulsions were unfair and racially biased. He called on the school board to reverse its decision.

2000s
On January 20, 2001, Bill Clinton's final day in office, Clinton pardoned Congressman Mel Reynolds, John Bustamante, and Dorothy Rivers; Jackson had requested pardons for them. Jackson had also requested a pardon for his half-brother Noah Robinson who had been convicted of murdering Leroy Barber and sentenced to life imprisonment, but Clinton did not pardon Robinson on the grounds that Robinson had already submitted three pardon appeals, all of which the Justice Department had denied.

Jackson was a target of a 2002 white supremacist terror plot.

In early 2005 Jackson visited Terri Schiavo's parents and supported their unsuccessful bid to keep her alive.

In 2005 the Federal Election Commission ruled that Jackson and the Democratic National Committee had violated electoral law and levied a $200,000 fine on them.

In March 2006 an African-American woman accused three white members of the Duke University men's lacrosse team of raping her. During the ensuing controversy, Jackson stated that his Rainbow/PUSH Coalition would pay for the rest of her college tuition regardless of the outcome of the case. The case against the three men was later thrown out and the players were declared innocent by the North Carolina Attorney General.

Jackson took a key role in the scandal caused by comedian Michael Richards's onstage racist tirade at the Laugh Factory in November 2006. Richards called Jackson a few days after the incident to apologize; Jackson accepted Richards' apology and met with him publicly as a means of resolving the situation. Jackson also joined Black leaders in a call for the elimination of the "N-word" throughout the entertainment industry.

On June 23, 2007, Jackson was arrested in connection with a protest at a gun store in Riverdale, a low-income suburb of Chicago. He and others were protesting due to allegations that the gun store had been selling firearms to local gang members and was contributing to the decay of the community. According to police reports, Jackson refused to stop blocking the front entrance of the store and let customers pass. He was charged with one count of criminal trespassing.

In March 2007 Jackson declared his support for then-Senator Barack Obama in the 2008 Democratic Party presidential primaries. He later criticized Obama in 2007 for "acting like he's white" in response to the Jena 6 beating case.

On July 6, 2008, during an interview with Fox News, a microphone picked up Jackson whispering to fellow guest Reed Tuckson: "See, Barack's been, ahh, talking down to black people on this faith-based... I want to cut his nuts off." Jackson was expressing his disappointment in Obama's Father's Day speech chastising absent Black fathers. Subsequent to his Fox News interview, Jackson apologized and reiterated his support for Obama.

On November 4, 2008, Jackson attended the Obama victory rally in Chicago's Grant Park. In the moments before Obama spoke, Jackson was seen in tears.

2010s

In 2012, Jackson commended Obama's 2012 decision to support gay marriage and compared the fight for marriage equality to the fight against slavery and the anti-miscegenation laws that once prevented interracial marriage. He favored federal legislation extending marriage rights to gay people. In the 2016 United States presidential election he endorsed Democratic candidate Hillary Clinton. During the 2019 Venezuelan presidential crisis he delivered food to activists occupying the Venezuelan embassy in Washington, D.C.

2020s

In the 2020 Democratic Party presidential primaries, Jackson endorsed Bernie Sanders.

On August 3, 2021, Jackson and several others were arrested after protesting for Congress to end the filibuster, protect voting rights and raise the federal minimum wage to $15 an hour.

Electoral history

Awards and recognition
Ebony Magazine named Jackson to its "100 most influential black Americans" list in 1971.

In 1979, Jackson received the Jefferson Award for Greatest Public Service Benefiting the Disadvantaged.

In 1988, the NAACP awarded Jackson its President's Award, and the next year, the organization awarded him the Spingarn Medal.

In 1991, Jackson received the American Whig-Cliosophic Society's James Madison Award for Distinguished Public Service.

In 1999 he received the Golden Doves for Peace journalistic prize awarded by the Italian Research Institute Archive Disarmo.

In August 2000, Bill Clinton awarded Jackson the Presidential Medal of Freedom, the nation's highest honor bestowed on civilians.

In 2002, scholar Molefi Kete Asante included Jackson on his list of 100 Greatest African Americans.

In 2008, Jackson was presented with an Honorary Fellowship from Edge Hill University.

In an AP-AOL "Black Voices" poll in February 2006, Jackson was voted "the most important black leader".

Jackson inherited the title of the High Prince of the Agni people of Côte d'Ivoire from Michael Jackson. In August 2009, he was crowned Prince Côte Nana by Amon N'Douffou V, King of Krindjabo, who rules more than a million Agni tribespeople.

In 2015, Jackson was awarded an honorary degree of Doctor Honoris Causa from the University of Edinburgh, in recognition of decades of campaigning for civil rights.

In 2021, Jackson was appointed Commander of the Legion of Honor, France's highest order of merit, presented by French president Emmanuel Macron, for his work in civil rights.

In December 2021, Jackson was elected an Honorary Fellow of Homerton College, Cambridge.

In 2022, Jackson received an Honorary Doctor of Humane Letters degree from Benedict College.

Personal life

Jackson married Jacqueline Lavinia Brown (born 1944) on December 31, 1962 and together they have five children: Santita (1963), Jesse Jr. (1965), Jonathan Luther (1966), Yusef DuBois (1970), and Jacqueline Lavinia (1975).

Jackson's younger brother, Charles "Chuck" Jackson, was a singer with the vocal group The Independents and as a solo artist issued two albums in the late 1970s. Along with his songwriting partner and fellow producer, Marvin Yancy, he was largely responsible for launching the career of Natalie Cole.

In 1984, Jackson and Coretta Scott King, the widow of Martin Luther King Jr., sent letters to Florida governor Bob Graham asking him to halt the scheduled execution of James Dupree Henry, a black man convicted of killing Z. L. Riley, an Orlando based civil rights leader. Jackson met with Graham, but was unable to persuade him, and Henry was executed on September 19, 1984.

On Memorial Day, May 25, 1987, Jesse was made a Master Mason on Sight by Grand Master Senter of the Most Worshipful Prince Hall Grand Lodge of Illinois; thereby making him a Prince Hall Freemason.

In 2001, it was revealed Jackson had an affair with a staffer, Karin Stanford, that resulted in the birth of a daughter Ashley in May 1999. According to CNN, in August 1999, the Rainbow Push Coalition had paid Stanford $15,000 in moving expenses and $21,000 in payment for contracting work. A promised advance of an additional $40,000 against future contracting work was rescinded once the affair became public. This incident prompted Jackson to withdraw from activism for a short time. Jackson was paying $4,000 a month in child support as of 2001.

In November 2017, Jackson was diagnosed with Parkinson's disease. In August 2021, he and his wife were hospitalized with COVID-19 at Northwestern Memorial Hospital in Chicago. On August 27, it was reported that he was transferred to a rehabilitation facility while his wife was transferred to the intensive care unit. On September 4, his wife was released from the hospital, while he continued to receive care for his Parkinson's disease.

See also
 "I Am – Somebody" - a poem popularized by Jesse Jackson
 List of civil rights leaders
 List of Notable Freemasons

References

Bibliography
 .
 .

External links

 Interview with Jesse Jackson About South African-US Relations from the Dean Peter Krogh Foreign Affairs Digital Archives
 
 
 Jesse Jackson - Keep Hope Alive
 Keep Hope Alive Affiliates
 Quotes at BrainyQuote
 Ubben Lecture at DePauw University
 1984 DNC speech transcript and audio
 1988 DNC speech transcript and audio
 "As GOP Appears to Win Extension of Bush-Era Tax Cuts for Wealthy, Rev. Jesse Jackson Calls for 'War on Poverty - video interview by Democracy Now!
Interview Reverend Jesse Jackson, 1984-12-01, In Black America; KUT Radio, American Archive of Public Broadcasting (WGBH and the Library of Congress)

|-

1941 births
 
African-American activists
20th-century American politicians
20th-century Baptist ministers from the United States
21st-century Baptist ministers from the United States
Activists for African-American civil rights
Activists from Chicago
African American adoptees
African-American Baptist ministers
African-American candidates for President of the United States
American adoptees
American football quarterbacks
American people of Cherokee descent
American Prince Hall Freemasons
Candidates in the 1984 United States presidential election
Candidates in the 1988 United States presidential election
Chicago Theological Seminary alumni
Grammy Award winners
Illinois Democrats
Living people
Minority rights activists
North Carolina A&T Aggies football players
North Carolina A&T State University alumni
People with Parkinson's disease
Players of American football from Chicago
Players of American football from South Carolina
Politicians from Chicago
Politicians from Greenville, South Carolina
Presidential Medal of Freedom recipients
Spingarn Medal winners
Sportspeople from Greenville, South Carolina
United States shadow senators from the District of Columbia
Washington, D.C., Democrats